This list of playing card nicknames shows the nicknames of playing cards in a standard 52-card pack. Some are generic while some are specific to certain card games; others are specific to patterns, such as the courts of French playing cards for example, which often bear traditional names. This list does not contain names that are specific to poker as  it would overwhelm the list and make it difficult to identify non-poker names. Poker nicknames are listed separately here.

Single cards
The following is a list of nicknames used for individual playing cards of the standard 52-card pack. Sometimes games require the revealing or announcement of cards, at which point appropriate nicknames may be used if allowed under the rules or local game culture.

See also
 Glossary of card game terms
 Glossary of poker terms
 Schafkopf language

Notes
The nine of diamonds playing card is often referred to as the Curse of Scotland or the Scourge of Scotland, there are a number of reasons given for this connection:
 It was the playing card used by Sir John Dalrymple, the Earl of Stair, to cryptically authorise the Glencoe Massacre. Certainly there is a resemblance between the nine of diamonds and his coat of arms.
 The Duke of Cumberland is supposed to have scribbled the order for "no quarter" to be given after the Battle of Culloden on a nine of diamonds playing card.
 It has also been suggested that it is a misreading of the "Corse of Scotland" i.e., the "Cross of Scotland" or St Andrew's Saltire. There is a resemblance between the pattern of the nine of diamonds and the Saltire.
 Nine diamonds were at one time stolen from the crown of Scotland and a tax was levied on the Scottish people to pay for them – the tax got the nickname "The Curse of Scotland".
 The game of Comète being introduced by Mary of Lorraine (alternatively by James, Duke of York) into the court at Holyrood, the Nine of Diamonds, being the winning card, got this name in consequence of the number of courtiers ruined by it.
 In the game of Pope Joan, the Nine of Diamonds is the Pope – a personage whom some Scottish Presbyterians consider as a curse.
 Diamonds imply royalty and every ninth king of Scotland was a curse to his country.

The Six of Hearts is known as loyalty at the risk of death or Grace's Card. This is because in 1689 emissaries of William of Orange called on John Grace, Baron of Courtstown, with an invitation to join the army of the usurper. On a playing-card lying on the table beside him he scrawled a contemptuous refusal: "Tell your master I despise his offer, and that honor and conscience are dearer to a gentleman than all the wealth and titles a prince can bestow". Baron Grace was loyal to King James II of England, and risked being shot or hanged for his refusal to give up. One hundred years later, in Kilkenny, the six of hearts was still known as ‘Grace's Card’.

The origin of The Bicycle, Little Wheel, Spoke, Steel Wheel, Steel Wheeled Bike or simply The Wheel is unknown, but it is believed to have something to do with the popular Bicycle Playing Cards issued by the United States Playing Card Company.

References

Playing cards
Card game terminology